The 2007 San Francisco mayoral election occurred on November 6, 2007. Voters elected a Mayor of San Francisco and several local officials. Incumbent Mayor Gavin Newsom was re-elected by an overwhelming margin. There were 12 candidates on the ballot as well as 6 write-ins.

Besides Newsom, other notable candidates included Josh Wolf, a journalist who was jailed for refusing to testify and turn over video evidence to a federal grand jury. Another candidate, "Chicken" John Rinaldi, qualified for public financing of his campaign but ran into procedural difficulties with San Francisco's Election Commission.

It was the first mayoral election in San Francisco history to use instant-runoff voting, also known as ranked-choice voting, so that there would be no need for a run-off, but a majority was reached in the first round and votes were not redistributed. Results of the election were not known for weeks because every ballot had to be hand-counted due to the long-running feud between the Elections Department of San Francisco and the California Secretary of State.

Issues
Many ongoing and emerging issues might have influenced this election, including:
 Newsom's popularity – Newsom's approval rating has remained high throughout his first term.
 Same-sex marriage – Newsom's 2004 directive permitting the issuance of marriage licenses to same-sex couples played a key role in garnering wide approval from the largely liberal city.
 Potholes, infrastructure, deferred maintenance, and the mayor's plans to improve Muni.
 Keeping the San Francisco 49ers football team within city limits, as the team has threatened to move to a more spacious suburban stadium in Santa Clara County. The move would create a situation similar to that of the New York Jets and New York Giants, who both play at the MetLife Stadium.
 The city's high homicide rate might also hurt Newsom during the campaign. A national survey gives San Francisco low marks for public safety. Indeed, San Francisco ranked well below both Los Angeles and New York City.
 Homelessness and transportation issues from previous years remain relevant. Public perception of the mayor's "Care, Not Cash" program (which reduces welfare payments in favor of long-term subsidized housing) will likely inform the debate.
 On February 1, 2007, Newsom admitted to having an affair with his campaign manager's wife, who was working in City Hall. Newsom later apologized about the scandal.

Results
Municipal elections in California are officially non-partisan, though most candidates in San Francisco do receive funding and support from various political parties.

References

External links

 Act Locally SF; Official Campaign Website for Gavin Newsom
 Race for Mayor 2007
 Cast of characters livens up the field

Candidate Web sites
 Quentin Mecke for Mayor 
 Ahimsa Porter Sumchai
 Vote for "Chicken" John Rimaldi
 Josh Wolf 4 Mayor

San Francisco
2007
San Francisco
mayoral
Gavin Newsom